Pangnasith Phettikone (born 24 September 1992) is a Laotian football player. He is a member of Laos national football team.

References 

1992 births
Living people
Laotian footballers
Laos international footballers
Place of birth missing (living people)
Association football midfielders